Oedopa is a genus of picture-winged flies in the family Ulidiidae.

Species
Oedopa ascriptiva Hendel, 1909
Oedopa capito Loew, 1868
Oedopa elegans Giglio-Tos, 1893

References

Ulidiidae
Brachycera genera
Taxa named by Hermann Loew
Diptera of North America